William Hickson (4 May 1877 – 30 November 1930) was a New Zealand cricketer. He played in twelve first-class matches for Wellington from 1896 to 1907.

See also
 List of Wellington representative cricketers

References

External links
 

1877 births
1930 deaths
New Zealand cricketers
Wellington cricketers
Cricketers from Greymouth